Icon is a greatest hits album by Megadeth, released in 2013 by Capitol Records. It is part of the Icon album series by Universal Music Enterprises, which absorbed Capitol in 2013.

Track listing

References

2014 greatest hits albums
Heavy metal compilation albums
Megadeth compilation albums